Chor Police is a 1983 Indian film, which is most famous for being the directorial debut movie of the Bollywood actor Amjad Khan. It stars Amjad Khan along with Shatrughan Sinha, Parveen Babi, Kader Khan and Shakti Kapoor. It also features special appearances by Ashok Kumar, Nirupa Roy, Vinod Mehra and Bindiya Goswami.

Plot
Inspector Sunil Rana has been assigned the case of triple-homicide of the Sinha family, namely Mr. Sinha, his son Inspector Rohan, and Rohan's wife. After an investigation, Sunil concludes that the assailant can only be Dr. Singh, who is going to escape from India, and re-locate to Dubai, United Arab Emirates, far from the jurisdiction of Bombay Police. Sunil must overcome borders to apprehend Dr. Singh, and thus bring justice to the Sinha family. It is then Sunil realises that Dr. Singh is not the only one involved in this homicide, which is far more complicated that he had thought it to be.

Cast
 Shatrughan Sinha as Inspector Sunil Rana
 Parveen Babi as Seema
 Shakti Kapoor as Tony
 Kader Khan as Dr. Singh
 Amjad Khan as Barkhi Khan
 Zarina Wahab as Anjana
 Ashok Kumar as Mr. Sinha (special appearance)
 Nirupa Roy as Mrs. Sinha (special appearance)
 Vinod Mehra Inspector Rohan Sinha (special appearance)
 Bindiya Goswami Mrs. Rohan Sinha (special appearance)
 Salah Alrifai in a special appearance from the UAE

Soundtrack
Composer: R. D. Burman
Lyrics: Nida Fazli

References

External links

1983 films
Films scored by R. D. Burman
1980s Hindi-language films
1983 directorial debut films